John More (died ca. 1588), of Ipswich and Little Brisset, Suffolk, was an English politician.

He was a Member of Parliament (MP) for Ipswich in 1571.

References

Year of birth missing
1588 deaths
Members of the Parliament of England (pre-1707) for Ipswich
English MPs 1571